Denton Bridge is a prominent bridge in The Gambia that connects the capital city of Banjul, located on St. Mary's Island, to the mainland. Named after Sir George Chardin Denton, the former Governor of Gambia, the bridge has a span of 210 m and crosses over the Tanbi Wetland Complex. The bridge is a girder bridge that opened in 1986 and is the sole roadway connecting the mainland to Banjul, with the only other method of entrance being a ferry from Barra.

See also
 Transport in the Gambia

References

Buildings and structures in Banjul
Bridges completed in 1986
Bridges in the Gambia
Road bridges